From the end of May to mid June 2022, more than 200 forest fires in different districts of Khyber Pakhtunkhwa damaged 14,430 acres of forests and pastures. While 402 incidents of forest fires were reported in one month. The highest number of 129 forest fires was reported in Abbottabad District. According to the report, forest fires broke out at 55 places in Mansehra District, 29 in Lakki Marwat District, 39 in Dera Ismail Khan District and 24 in Swat District.

Haripur wildfire

On 16 May 2022, hundreds of acres of forest trees reduced to ashes in 70% of the forest area.

Shangla District wildfire

On 4 June 2022, a forest fire in Ali Jan Capri area of Chakesar, a remote area of Shangla District, killed 4 member of a family.

References

2022 in Pakistan
Fires in Pakistan
Wildfires in Pakistan
2022 wildfires
May 2022 events in Pakistan
June 2022 events in Pakistan
2022 disasters in Pakistan